Bahraini Gulf Arabic is a Gulf Arabic dialect spoken in Bahrain. It is spoken by Sunni Bahrainis and is a dialect which is most similar to the urban dialect spoken in Qatar, the dialect spoken in Kuwait and Iraq.

An sociolinguistic feature of Bahrain is the existence of three distinct dialects: Bahrani Arabic (a dialect primarily spoken by Baharna in Shia villages and some parts of Manama), Sunni and Ajami Arabic.

In Bahrain, the Sunni muslims form a minority of the population, but the ruling family is Sunni. Therefore, the Arabic dialect represented on TV is almost invariably that of the Sunni population. Therefore, power, prestige and financial control are associated with the Sunni Arabs. This is having a major effect on the direction of language change in Bahrain.

As with all Bahraini dialects, it is heavily influenced by the Persian Language.

References

Arabic languages
Peninsular Arabic